La Petite Fabrique (The Little Factory) is an oil painting on canvas by the French artist Camille Pissarro.

History
The small work is thought to have been painted between 1862 and 1865. It was presented to the Strasbourg museum by the Société des amis des musées de la ville de Strasbourg (today called the Société des amis des arts et des musées de Strasbourg, or SAAMS) in 1924 and is now in the Musée d'Art moderne et contemporain. Its inventory number is 55.974.0.684.

Transition
La Petite Fabrique marks a transition in Pissarro's work, away from Neoclassical landscape depictions à la Camille Corot and towards Realism with underlying social motives. In spite of its peacefulness and nonthreatening size, the little factory announces the inexorable transformation (i. e. industrialisation) of the countryside.

See also
List of paintings by Camille Pissarro

References

External links

Paintings in the collection of the Strasbourg Museum of Modern and Contemporary Art
Paintings by Camille Pissarro
1860s paintings
Landscape paintings
Oil on canvas paintings